Sir Angus Frank Johnstone-Wilson, CBE (11 August 191331 May 1991) was an English novelist and short story writer. He was one of England's first openly gay authors. He was awarded the 1958 James Tait Black Memorial Prize for The Middle Age of Mrs Eliot and later received a knighthood for his services to literature.

Biography

Wilson was born in Bexhill, Sussex, England, to an English father, William Johnstone-Wilson, and South African mother, Maude (née Caney), of a wealthy merchant family of Durban. Wilson's grandfather had served in a prestigious Scottish army regiment, and owned an estate in Dumfriesshire, where William Johnstone-Wilson (despite being born at Haymarket) was raised, and where he subsequently lived.

Wilson was educated at Westminster School and Merton College, Oxford, and in 1937 became a librarian in the British Museum's Department of Printed Books, working on the new General Catalogue. Previous employment included tutoring, catering, and co-managing a restaurant with his brother.

During World War II, he worked in the Naval section at the code-breaking establishment, Bletchley Park, translating Italian Naval codes. A wearer of large, brightly coloured bow-ties and shirts, he was one of the "famous homosexuals" at Bletchley. He was billeted with a "kind family" in the village of Simpson, who worried about his "prodigious consumption" of cigarettes by coughing theatrically. They only read (and re-read) Bunyan's "Holy War". The "claustrophobia" of the billet may have contributed to his increasing depression and his "Pompeiian mood swings". The work situation was stressful and led to a nervous breakdown, for which he was treated by Rolf-Werner Kosterlitz. A colleague said when he threw an inkpot at a Wren that "Angus isn't really mad. He threw inkpots at all the right people!"    

A Wren, Dorothy Robertson, was taught traffic analysis by him and another instructor. She recalled him as:

He returned to the Museum after the end of the War, and it was there that he met Tony Garrett (born 1929), who was to be his companion for the rest of his life. Years later their life together was sympathetically portrayed in the BBC2 film "Angus and Tony" (1984), directed by Jonathan Gili. It was one of the first depictions of the life of a gay couple on British television.

Wilson's first publication was a collection of short stories, The Wrong Set (1949), followed quickly by the daring novel Hemlock and After, which was a great success, prompting invitations to lecture in Europe.

He worked as a reviewer, and in 1955 he resigned from the British Museum to write full-time (although his financial situation did not justify doing so) and moved to Suffolk.

He was instrumental in getting Colin Wilson's first novel published in 1956 and from 1957 he gave lectures further afield, in Japan, Switzerland, Australia, and the USA. He was appointed a Commander of the Order of the British Empire (CBE) in the 1968 New Year Honours, and received many literary honours in succeeding years. He was made a Knight Bachelor in the 1980 Birthday Honours, and was President of the Royal Society of Literature from 1982 to 1988. His remaining years were affected by ill health, and he died of a stroke at a nursing home in Bury St Edmunds, Suffolk, on 31 May 1991, aged 77.

His writing, which has a strongly satirical vein, expresses his concern with preserving a liberal humanistic outlook in the face of fashionable doctrinaire temptations. Several of his works were adapted for television. He was Professor of English Literature at the University of East Anglia from 1966 to 1978, and jointly helped to establish their creative writing course at masters level in 1970, which was then a groundbreaking initiative in the United Kingdom.

His medals, then in private ownership, were shown on the BBC Television programme Antiques Roadshow in August 2018.

Bibliography

Novels
Hemlock and After (1952)
Anglo-Saxon Attitudes (1956)
The Middle Age of Mrs Eliot (1958)
The Old Men at the Zoo (1961)
Late Call (1964)
No Laughing Matter (1967)
As If By Magic (1973)
Setting the World on Fire (1980)

Short story collections
The Wrong Set (1949)
Such Darling Dodos (1950)
A Bit Off the Map (1957)
Death Dance (selected stories, 1969)

Play
The Mulberry Bush (1955)

Others
For Whom the Cloche Tolls: a Scrapbook of the Twenties (1953)
The Wild Garden or Speaking of Writing (1963)
The World of Charles Dickens (1970)
The Naughty Nineties (1976)
The Strange Ride of Rudyard Kipling: His Life and Works (1977)
Diversity and Depth in Fiction: Selected Critical Writings of Angus Wilson (1983)
Reflections In A Writer's Eye: travel pieces by Angus Wilson (1986)

References

Bibliography
Conradi, Peter, Isobel Armstrong and Bryan Loughrey (editors), "Angus Wilson", Northcote House, 1997, .
Drabble, Margaret. Angus Wilson: A Biography.London: Secker & Warburg, 1995.  (Hardcover)  (Paperback)
Halio, Jay, "Angus Wilson", Oliver & Boyd, London, 1964.
Stape, John Henry and Anne N. Thomas. Angus Wilson: A Bibliography 1947–1987. London & New York: Mansell Publishing, 1988. .

External links

 
 
 Evaluation by D. J. Taylor in The Guardian
 Finding aid to Joseph Kissane correspondence with Angus Wilson at Columbia University. Rare Book & Manuscript Library.

1913 births
1991 deaths
English people of Scottish descent
People educated at Westminster School, London
Alumni of Merton College, Oxford
Academics of the University of East Anglia
English short story writers
English satirists
Bletchley Park people
People from Bexhill-on-Sea
Commanders of the Order of the British Empire
Knights Bachelor
James Tait Black Memorial Prize recipients
English LGBT novelists
20th-century English novelists
20th-century British short story writers
Presidents of the Royal Society of Literature
English gay writers
20th-century LGBT people